Giulia is the Italian version of the feminine given name Julia. The corresponding Italian male name is Giulio. People with that name include:

 Santa Giulia da Corsica (died ), Christian saint and martyr
Giulia Anghelescu (born 1984), Romanian singer
 Giulia Arcioni (born 1986), Italian sprinter who competed in the 2008 Summer Olympics
 Giulia Arena (born 1994), Italian beauty queen, television presenter and model
 Giulia Bevilacqua (born 1979), Italian film, stage and television actress
 Giulia Boschi (born 1962), Italian film and television actress
 Giulia Botti (born 1980), Italian ski mountaineer and triathlete
 Giulia Casoni (born 1978), Italian tennis player
 Maria Giulia Confalonieri (born 1993), Italian track and road racing cyclist
 Giulia Conti (born 1985), Italian sailor who competed in the 2004, 2008 and 2012 Summer Olympics
 Giulia Maria Crespi (1923–2020), Italian media proprietor
 Giulia Crostarosa (1696–1755), Italian Roman Catholic nun who founded the Order of Redemptoristine Nuns
Giulia de' Medici (–), illegitimate daughter of Alessandro de' Medici
 Giulia della Rena (1319–1367), Italian Roman Catholic professed member of the Order of Saint Augustine
 Giulia della Rovere (1531–1563), Italian noblewoman whose portrait was painted by Titian
 Giulia Di Nunno (born 1973), Italian mathematician
 Giulia Domenichetti (born 1984), Italian footballer
 Giulia Donato (born 1992), Italian professional racing cyclist
 Giulia Enrica Emmolo (born 1991), Italian water polo player
 Giulia Enders (born 1990), German writer and scientist
Giulia Farnese (1474–1524), mistress of Pope Alexander VI
 Giulia Masucci Fava (1858–after 1891), Italian painter
 Giulia Civita Franceschi (1870–1957), Italian educator
Giulia Gam (born 1966), Italian-born Brazilian actress
 Giulia Gatto-Monticone (born 1987), Italian professional tennis player
Giulia Gonzaga (1513–1566), Italian noblewoman
 Giulia Elettra Gorietti (born 1988), Italian actress
 Giulia Gorlero (born 1990), Italian water polo goalkeeper
Giulia Grisi (1811–1869), Italian operatic soprano
 Giulia Rambaldi Guidasci (born 1986), Italian water polo player who competed at the 2012 Summer Olympics
 Giulia Jones (born 1980), Australian politician
 Giulia Lacedelli (born 1971), Italian curler
 Giulia Lama (–after 1753), Italian painter,
 Giulia Lapi (born 1985), Italian synchronized swimmer who competed in the 2008 and 2012 Summer Olympics
 Giulia Lazzarini (born 1934), Italian actress
 Giulia Lorenzoni (born 1940), Italian fencer who competed at the 1968, 1972 and 1976 Summer Olympics
 Giulia Luzi (born 1994), Italian actress, singer, and dubbing voice actor
 Giulia Marletta (active from 2000), Italian-born film producer, director, and entertainment executive
 Giulia Melucci (born 1966), American writer
 Giulia Michelini (born 1985), Italian actress
 Giulia Moi (born 1971), Italian Member of the European Parliament
 Giulia Molinaro (born 1990), Italian professional golfer
 Giulia Momoli (born 1981), Italian beach volleyball player
 Giulia Niccolai (1934–2021), Italian photographer, poet, novelist and translator
 Giulia Novelli (1859–1932), Italian operatic mezzo-soprano
 Giulia Pennella (born 1989), Italian hurdler
 Giulia Quintavalle (born 1983), Italian judoka who a gold medal at the 2008 Summer Olympics
 Giulia Recli (1890–1970), Italian composer and essayist
 Giulia Riva (born 1992), Italian sprinter
 Giulia Rondon (born 1987), Italian professional volleyball player who competed in the 2012 Summer Olympics
 Giulia Rubini (born 1935), Italian actress
 Giulia Salzano (1846–1929), Italian Roman Catholic professed religious, canonized 2010
 Giulia Sergas (born 1979), Italian professional golfer
Giulia Siegel (AKA Giulia Legeis, born 1974), German model
 Giulia Steingruber (born 1994), Swiss artistic gymnast
 Giulia Tofana (died 1659), Italian professional poisoner
 Giulia Turco (1848–1912), Italian noblewoman, naturalist and writer
 Giulia Valle (1847–1916), Italian Roman Catholic nun and professed member of the Sisters of Charity of Saint Joan Antida Thouret
 Giulia Villoresi (born 1984), Italian writer
 Giulia Viola (active from 2013), Italian middle-distance runner
 Giulia Warwick (1857–1904), English operatic soprano and actress

See also
 Giulia (disambiguation)
 Giulietta (disambiguation)
 Giulio (disambiguation)
 Guilia
 Julia (given name)
 Juliet (disambiguation)

Italian feminine given names